Martha Ribi-Raschle (28 November 1915 in Zurich – 4 October 2010 in Uster, canton of Zurich) was a Swiss politician of the Free Democratic Party (FDP). She was among the first women to seat in the National Council in 1971.

Biography
She was the daughter of a bank employee. She obtained the matura in 1935 and stayed in Italy and England to learn languages. She got married in 1936. After the early death of her husband, she worked as a secretary for the medical service of the City of Zurich from 1945 to 1977 before she became an adjunct professor in 1964. In the meantime, she studied economics at the University of Zurich from 1957 to 1963 and earned a licentiate degree.

She joined the Free Democratic Party of Switzerland in 1963 and became a member of the party's Women's Union (SVFF). In 1970, she unsuccessfully stood in the Zurich communal council election. After women's suffrage was introduced in the canton of Zurich, Ribi was elected to the Cantonal Council of Zürich in Zurich's 2nd constituency in 1971.

In the October 31, 1971 federal election, Ribi was elected as a National Councillor. She represented the FDP party during three terms until 1983. She was among the first ten women to ever seat in the National Council, and one of the three earliest female representatives of the canton of Zurich alongside Hedi Lang and Lilian Uchtenhagen.

Besides her short term as the deputy chairwoman of the FDP, she was recognised for her work in social and healthcare policy in the Federal Assembly. She published her opinions in professional journals. Moreover, she was the chairwoman of the Association of the Ergotherapeutic School of Zurich.

References

Bibliography
 
 

20th-century Swiss women politicians
Women members of the National Council (Switzerland)
Members of the National Council (Switzerland)
Free Democratic Party of Switzerland politicians
Politics of the canton of Zürich
University of Zurich alumni
1915 births
Politicians from Zürich
2010 deaths
20th-century Swiss politicians